Ernie is a masculine given name, frequently a short form (hypocorism) of Ernest, Ernald, Ernesto, or Verner. It may refer to:

People
 Ernie Accorsi (born 1941), American football executive
 Ernie Adams (disambiguation)
 Ernie Afaganis (born c. 1933), Canadian sports announcer
 Ernie Althoff (born 1950), Australian musician and composer
 Ernie Anastos (born 1943), American television journalist
 Ernie Anderson (1923–1997), American radio and television announcer
 Ernie Ashcroft (1925–1985), English rugby league footballer
 Ernie Ball (1930–2004), American guitarist and businessman
 Ernie Banks (1931–2015), American baseball player
 Ernie Barbarash, American film producer
 Ernie Barnes (1938–2009), American football player and painter
 Ernie Blenkinsop (1902–1969), English footballer
 Ernie Boch Jr. (born 1958), American billionaire businessman
 Ernie Bond (disambiguation)
 Ernie Bridge (1936–2013), Australian politician
 Ernie Broglio (1935–2019), American baseball pitcher
 Ernie Bushmiller (1905–1982), American cartoonist
 Ernie Calcutt (1932–1984), Canadian sports commentator and radio news director
 Ernie Calloway (born 1948), American football player
 Ernie Colón (1931–2019), American comics artist
 Ernie Coombs (1927-2001), Canadian entertainer
 Ernie Cox (1894–1962), Canadian football player
 Ernie Danjean (1934–1995), American football player
 Ernie Davis (1939–1963), American football player
 Ernie DiGregorio (born 1951), American basketball player
 Ernie Dodd (1880–1918), New Zealand rugby union player
 Ernie Dubeau (1880–1951), Canadian ice hockey player
 Ernie Duplechin, American football and baseball player and football coach
 Ernie Els (born 1969), South African golfer
 Ernie Ernst (1924/25–2013), American district attorney and jurist
 Ernie Fletcher (born 1952), American physician and politician, 60th Governor of Kentucky
 Tennessee Ernie Ford (1919–1991), American singer
 Ernie Graham (1946–2001), Northern Irish singer and songwriter
 Ernie Green (born 1938), American football player
 Ernie Grunfeld (born 1955), American basketball player and executive
 Ernie Hammes (born 1968), Luxembourgian jazz trumpeter
 Ernie Hardeman (born 1947), Canadian politician
 Ernie Hart (1910–1985), American comics artist and writer
 Ernie Harwell (1918–2010), American sports announcer
 Ernie Hawkins (born 1947), American blues singer and musician
 Ernie Henry (1926–1957), American jazz saxophonist
 Ernie Hine (1901–1974), English footballer
 Ernie Hughes (born 1955), American football player
 Ernie Hudson (born 1945), American actor
 Ernie Isley (born 1952), American singer and musician
 Ernie Isley (politician) (born 1937), Canadian politician
 Ernie Jennings (born 1949), American football player
 Ernie Johnson (disambiguation)
 Ernie Jones (disambiguation)
 Ernie Kovacs (1919–1962), American comedian, actor and writer
 Ernie Lombardi (1908–1977), American baseball player
 Ernie Maresca (1938–2015), American singer-songwriter
 Ernie Merrick (born 1953), Scottish-Australian football manager
 Ernie Mims, stage name of Ernest Christoper Memos (1932–2019), American television personality
 Ernie Morgan (1927–2013), English football player and manager
 Ernie Nevers (1902–1976), American football and baseball player and college football head coach
 Ernie Newton (disambiguation)
 Ernie Nordli (1912–1968), American animation artist and graphic designer
 Ernie Odoom, Swiss jazz musician and vocalist
 Ernie O'Malley (1897–1957), Irish Republican Army officer and writer
 Ernie Oravetz (1932–2006), American baseball player
 Ernie O'Rourke (born 1926), Australian rules footballer
 Ernie Orsatti (1902–1968), American baseball player
 Ernie Otten (born 1954), American politician
 Ernie Ovitz (1885–1980), American baseball player
 Ernie Padgett (1899–1957), American baseball player
 Ernie Parker (1883–1918), Australian tennis player and cricketer
 Ernie Phythian (born 1942), English former footballer
 Ernie Pitts (1935–1970), Canadian football player
 Ernie Preate (born 1940), American attorney and politician
 Ernie Price (born 1950), American football player
 Ernie Price (English footballer) (1926–2013)
 Ernie Pyle (1900–1945), American journalist and war correspondent
 Ernie Rea (born 1945), Northern Irish radio presenter
 Ernie Regehr, Canadian pacifist
 Ernie Reid (c.1905 – c.1938), Australian rugby union player
 Ernie Renzel (1907–2007), American politician
 Ernie Rettino, American Christian musician
 Ernie Reyes Jr. (born 1972), American actor and martial artist
 Ernie Reyes Sr. (born 1947), American martial artist, actor, and fight choreographer
 Ernie Rice (1896–1979), English boxer and actor
 Ernie Richardson (curler) (born 1931), Canadian curler
 Ernie Richardson (footballer) (1916–1977), English footballer
 Ernie Roberts (1912–1994), English politician and trade unionist
 Ernie Robson (1870–1924), English cricketer
 Ernie Roth (1926–1983), American professional wrestler and wrestling manager
 Ernie Royal (1921–1983), American jazz trumpeter
 Ernie Sabella (born 1949), American actor
 Ernie Schaaf (1908–1933), American boxer
 Ernie Schroeder (1916–2006), American comics artist
 Ernie Schunke (1882–1922), Australian rules footballer
 Ernie Shore (1891–1980), American baseball pitcher
 Ernie Sigley (1938–2021), Australian radio and television personality
 Ernie Sims (born 1984), American football player
 Ernie Smith (disambiguation)
 Ernie Stautner (1925–2006), American football player and coach
 Ernie Steury (1930–2002), American physician and missionary
 Ernie Walker (baseball) (1890–1965), American baseball player
 Ernie Walker (football) (1928–2011), Scottish football administrator
 Ernie Watts (born 1945), American jazz and R&B saxophonist
 Ernie Watts (Small Heath footballer), English footballer who played for Small Heath (188–1890)
 Ernie Watts (footballer, born 1872) (1872–?), English footballer
 Ernie Whitchurch (1891–1957), English footballer
 Ernie White (1916–1974), American baseball pitcher
 Ernie White (Canadian football) (born 1938), American-born Canadian football player 
 Ernie Whiteside (1889–1953), English footballer
 Ernie Whitt (born 1952), American baseball player
 Ernie Whittam (1911–1951), English footballer
 Ernie Whittle (1925–1998), English footballer
 Ernie Wiggs (c.1940–2014), New Zealand rugby league footballer
 Ernie Wilkins (1919–1999), American jazz saxophonist
 Ernie Willett (1919–1985), English footballer
 Ernie Williamson (1922–2002), American football player and coach
 Ernie Winchester (1944–2013), Scottish footballer
 Ernie Wise, stage name of English comedian Ernest Wiseman (1925–1999), half of the comedy duo Morecambe and Wise
 Ernie Woerner (1905–1972), American football player
 Ernie Wolf (1889–1964), American baseball pitcher
 Ernie Wright (1939–2007), American football player
 Ernie Wright (footballer) (1912–?), English footballer

Fictional characters 
 Ernie (Sesame Street), a Muppet on the TV show Sesame Street
 Ernie, on the TV series Underground Ernie
 Ernie Pantusso, also known as "Coach" on the TV show Cheers
 Ernie the Giant Chicken, on the TV series Family Guy
 Ernie Cardenas, on the TV series George Lopez
 Ernie Macmillan, in the Harry Potter novels by J. K. Rowling
 Evil Ernie, a comics character created by Brian Pulido and Steven Hughes
 Ernie, in the TV series Mighty Morphin Power Rangers and Power Rangers Zeo
 Ernie Bishop, in the film It's a Wonderful Life
 Ernie Floyd, in the comic strip Piranha Club
 Ernie "Big Ern" McCracken, in the film Kingpin
 Ernie Pike, in the comic strip Ernie Pike
 Ernie Thompson, in the TV series My Three Sons
 Uncle Ernie, in the Who's rock opera Tommy

See also 
Erne (disambiguation)
Erni, a given name and surname
Ernie (disambiguation)
 

Masculine given names
Hypocorisms
English masculine given names